Latchkey Kids is an upcoming American black comedy film directed by John J. Budion and starring Elsie Fisher and Alan Kim.

Plot
Shae, a very smart nine year old boy becomes friends with an eccentric teenage girl looking to escape her troubling life that her mother has created for her.

Production
Production for Latchkey Kids began in June 2021.

References

External links

American black comedy films
Upcoming English-language films
American coming-of-age comedy films
2020s English-language films